Cecil Lay is a former member of the House of Assembly of Saint Lucia for Vieux-Fort North. He is a member of the Saint Lucia Labour Party.

References 

Living people
Members of the House of Assembly of Saint Lucia
Saint Lucia Labour Party politicians
People from Vieux Fort Quarter
Year of birth missing (living people)